A Life Without Pain is a 2005 documentary film by Melody Gilbert about children who can't feel pain.

Plot synopsis
The film explores the daily lives of three children with Congenital insensitivity to pain, a rare genetic disorder shared by just a hundred people in the world. Three-year-old Gabby from Minnesota, 7-year-old Miriam from Norway and 10-year-old Jamilah from Germany have to be carefully guarded by their parents so they don't suffer serious, life-altering injuries.

Reception
The release of the film garnered widespread interest in the topic, and the character Gabby was featured on The Oprah Winfrey Show in 2006.

References

External links

 Official Website

2005 films
Documentary films about children with disability
American documentary films
2000s English-language films
2000s American films